A referendum on restoring the monarchy was held in Albania on 29 June 1997 alongside parliamentary elections. The proposal was rejected by 66.7% of voters. However, former Crown Prince Leka claimed that 65.7% voted in favour.

Results

Reactions
The House of Zogu never accepted the official result of the referendum. After the publication of the result by the Central Election Commission of Albania, during the 1997 rebellion in Albania, Leka returned again, this time being greeted by 2,000 supporters. 

After a recount it was announced that the restoration was rejected by approximately two-thirds of those voting. The former Crown Prince questioned the independence of the election. Police intervened, gunfire broke out, one person was killed, and Leka fled.

On 30 November 2011, the former crown prince died, his son (Leka II) succeeding him as pretender to the defunct throne. That month, Prime Minister Sali Berisha questioned whether there was vote manipulation in the referendum, stating that "The referendum was held under the flares of a communist rebellion and cannot be considered a closed issue."

References

Albanian Civil War
Referendums in Albania
Albania
Monarchy
Albanian monarchy
Monarchy referendums
June 1997 events in Europe